The Hale River is a river in the southeast of Australia's Northern Territory. Most of the year, however, it has no water.

Geography

River course

Most of its water seeps away in the western part of the Simpson Desert. Only in very wet years does it continue its course south and flows south of the border to South Australia, in Witjira National Park, into the Finke River.

Tributaries
Winnecke Depot Creek - 669 m
Tug Creek - 583 m
Florence Creek - 560 m
Pig Hole Creek - 479 m
Cleary Creek - 375 m
Five Mile Creek - 364 m
Pulya Pulya Creek - 308 m
Todd River - 264 m

The Todd River mostly seeps away near the Hale River in the Simpson Desert. It only overflows into the Hale River in very wet years.

Lakes flowed through
The Hale River flows through a water hole that is usually filled with water even when the river itself is dry:

Coulthards Gap Waterhole - 437 meters

See also

References 

Rivers of the Northern Territory
Lake Eyre basin